The metamonads are microscopic eukaryotic organisms, a large group of flagellate amitochondriate Loukozoa.  Their composition is not entirely settled, but they include the retortamonads, diplomonads, and possibly the parabasalids and oxymonads as well.  These four groups are all anaerobic (many being aerotolerant anaerobes), occurring mostly as symbiotes or parasites of animals, as is the case with Giardia lamblia which causes diarrhea in mammals.

Characteristics
A number of parabasalids and oxymonads are found in termite guts, and play an important role in breaking down the cellulose found in wood.  Some other metamonads are parasites.

These flagellates are unusual in lacking mitochondria.  Originally they were considered among the most primitive eukaryotes, diverging from the others before mitochondria appeared.  However, they are now known to have lost mitochondria secondarily, and retain both organelles and nuclear genes derived from them.  Mitochondrial relics include hydrogenosomes, which produce hydrogen, and small structures called mitosomes.

It now appears the Metamonada are, together with Malawimonas, sister clades of the Podiata.

All of these groups are united by having flagella or basal bodies in characteristic groups of four, which are often associated with the nucleus, forming a structure called a karyomastigont.  In addition, the genera Carpediemonas and Trimastix are now known to be close relatives of the retortamonad-diplomonad line and the oxymonads, respectively.  Both are free-living and amitochondriate.

Classification 
The metamonads make up part of the Excavata, a eukaryotic supergroup including flagellates with feeding grooves and their close relatives.  Their relationships are uncertain, and they do not always appear together on molecular trees.  It is possible that the metamonads as defined here do not form a monophyletic subgroup.

The following higher level treatment is based on works of Cavalier-Smith with amendments within Fornicata from Yubukia, Simpson & Leander

Metamonada were once again proposed to being basal eukaryotes in 2018.

 Phylum Metamonada (Grassé 1952) Cavalier-Smith 1987 emend. Cavalier-Smith 2003
 Subphylum Anaeromonada Cavalier-Smith 1997 emend. 2003
 Class Anaeromonadea Cavalier-Smith 1997 emend. 1999
 Family Paratrimastigidae Zhang et al. 2015
 Order Trimastigida Cavalier-Smith 2003
 Family Trimastigidae Saville Kent 1880
 Order Oxymonadida Grassé 1952 emend. Cavalier-Smith 2003
 Family Polymastigidae Bütschli 1884
 Family Saccinobaculidae Brugerolle & Lee 2002 ex Cavalier-Smith 2013
 Family Pyrsonymphidae Grassé 1892
 Family Streblomastigidae Kofoid & Swezy 1919
 Family Oxymonadidae Kirby 1928
 Subphylum Trichozoa Cavalier-Smith 1996 emend. Cavalier-Smith 2003 stat. n. 2013
 Superclass Fornicata Simpson 2003 stat. n. Cavalier-Smith 2013
 Genus Ergobibamus
 Genus Hicanonectes
 Family Kipferliidae Cavalier-Smith 2013
 Order Chilomastigida Cavalier-Smith 2013
 Family Chilomastigidae Cavalier-Smith 2013
 Order Dysnectida Cavalier-Smith 2013
 Family Dysnectidae Cavalier-Smith 2013
 Class Carpediemonadea Cavalier-Smith 2013 s.s.
 Order Carpediemonadida Cavalier-Smith 2003 emend. 2013 s.s.
 Family Carpediemonadidae Cavalier-Smith 2003
 Class Eopharyngea Cavalier-Smith 1993 stat. n. Cavalier-Smith 2003
 Order Retortamonadida Grassé 1952 emend. Cavalier-Smith 2013
 Family Retortamonadidae Wenrich 1932
 Order Diplomonadida Wenyon 1926 emend. Brugerolle et al. 1975
 Family Giardiidae Kulda & Nohy´nkova´ 1978
 Family Octomitidae Cavalier-Smith 1996
 Family Spironucleidae Cavalier-Smith 1996
 Family Hexamitidae Kent 1880 emend. Brugerolle et al. 1975
 Superclass Parabasalia Honigberg 1973 stat. n. Cavalier-Smith 2003
 Class Chilomitea
 Order Chilomitida
 Family Chilomitidae
 Class Trichonymphea Cavalier-Smith 2003
 Order Lophomonadida Light 1927
 Family Lophomonadidae Saville Kent 1880
 Order Trichonymphida Poche 1913
 Family Spirotrichosomidae Hollande & Caruette-Valentin 1971
 Family Staurojoeninidae Grassé 1917
 Family Trichonymphidae Saville Kent 1880
 Family Hoplonymphidae Light 1926
 Family Teranymphidae Koidzumi 1921 [Eucomonymphidae]
 Class Trichomonadea Kirby 1947 stat. n. Cavalier-Smith 2003
 Order Trichocovinida
 Family Trichocovinidae
 Order Trichomonadida Kirby 1947
 Suborder Hypotrichomonadina Čepička et al. 2010 stat. n.
 Family Hypotrichomonadidae (Honigberg 1963) Čepička, Hampl & Kulda 2010 
 Suborder Trichomonadina (Kirby 1947) Cavalier-Smith 2013
 Family Trichomonadidae Chalmers & Pekkoloa 1918 sensu Hampl et al. 2006
 Suborder Honigbergiellina Čepička et al. 2010
 Family Honigbergiellidae Čepička, Hampl & Kulda 2010
 Family Hexamastigidae Čepička, Hampl & Kulda 2010
 Family Tricercomitidae Čepička, Hampl & Kulda 2010
 Order Tritrichomonadida Čepička et al. 2010
 Family Dientamoebidae Grassé 1953
 Family Monocercomonadidae Kirby 1944
 Family Simplicimonadidae Čepička et al. 2010
 Family Tritrichomonadidae Honigberg 1963
 Subclass Cristomonadia Cavalier-Smith, 2013
 Order Spirotrichonymphida Grassé 1952
 Family Spirotrichonymphidae Grassé 1917
 Order Cristamonadida Brugerolle & Patterson 2001 emend. Cavalier-Smith 2013
 Family Calonymphidae Grassé 1911
 Family Devescovinidae Doflein 1911 [Joeniidae; Rhizonymphidae; Kofoidiidae; Deltotrichonymphidae]

References

External links 
 Tree of Life: Fornicata

Taxa named by Pierre-Paul Grassé